The Toronto Courthouse is a major courthouse in Toronto, Ontario, Canada, located behind Osgoode Hall at 361 University Avenue, north of Queen Street West. It is a branch of the Ontario Superior Court of Justice and is used for criminal trials.

History
The site of the Toronto Courthouse was previously occupied by Thomas Fuller's Romanesque Revival style Toronto Armories, demolished in 1963. The new courthouse was built in 1967 as the Metropolitan Toronto Courthouse. It served as a courthouse for York County, which formerly included the City of Metropolitan Toronto. After 1980, it served solely as a courthouse for Toronto.

Architecture
The building was designed by architect Ronald A. Dick, who described its form as one of "dignity and convenience." The imposing structure features fin walls (walls strengthened by equally-spaced piers), a 12-sided form and an open passageway of the adjoining South Wing (completed in 1985).

There is a tunnel connecting the building to nearby Osgoode Hall. Two additional stories were added in 1987. It was one of the last large complexes in Ontario created with local Queenston limestone.

References

Buildings and structures in Toronto
Courthouses in Canada
Modernist architecture in Canada
Government buildings completed in 1967
1967 establishments in Ontario